The Ottoman Empire's embassies were first established in the 1830s.

In 1870 the first permanent Ottoman diplomatic mission opened in London. The Ottoman Empire began classifying missions as great embassies, as legations/first class embassies, second class embassies, and third class embassies, beginning in 1886.

Europe
 Austria-Hungary
 Vienna – Classified as a "great" embassy
 Belgium
 Brussels – Classified as a third class embassy
 Denmark
 Copenhagen – Opened in 1917
 France
 Paris – Classified as a "great" embassy
 Germany
 Berlin – The legation began in 1837 with embassy status in 1874
 Greece
 Athens – Classified as a "legation" or a "first class embassy"
 Italy
 Rome – A single embassy for Italy was established upon the Unification of Italy
 Montenegro
 Çetine – Classified as a third class embassy, opened in 1880
 Kingdom of Romania
 Bucharest – Classified as a "legation" or a "first class embassy", opened in 1878
 Russian Empire
 Saint Petersburg – The legation opened in 1857 with embassy status in 1873
 Kingdom of Sardinia
 Turin – Closed upon the unification of Italy
 Serbia
 Belgrade – Opened in 1879
 Kingdom of Sicily
 Palermo – Closed upon the unification of Italy
 Sweden
 Stockholm – Opened in 1898
 Switzerland
 Bern – Opened in 1915
 United Kingdom
 London – Classified as a "great" embassy
 Ukrainian People's Republic
 Kiev – This opened in 1918 and was the last Ottoman embassy to open.

North America

 United States
 Washington, DC (Embassy) – Classified as a "second class embassy". The empire sent its first envoy in 1867. It was designated as an embassy in 1912. In 1917 diplomatic relations ended.
 New York City (Consulate-General) – Established after the 1880s to monitor anti-Ottoman activity.
 Boston (Consulate-General) – Established in 1910 so the Ottomans could surveil Armenians in the U.S.

South America
Brazil
Rio de Janeiro
Sao Paulo

See also
 Ottoman Empire Ministry of Foreign Affairs

References

1830s establishments in the Ottoman Empire
Diplomatic missions of the Ottoman Empire
Diplomatic missions
Ottoman Empire